Robot and Monster is an American CGI animated television series created by Dave Pressler, Joshua Sternin and Jennifer Ventimilia. Main characters Robot and Monster are voiced by Curtis Armstrong and comedian Harland Williams, respectively. It began production in 2009 and was ordered for a full 26-episode season in 2010, before finally premiering on Nickelodeon on August 4, 2012. Most episodes aired on Nickelodeon, but several episodes were left unaired on the channel. Some of these episodes later premiered on Nicktoons, and the remaining unaired segments were released on the Noggin streaming app on March 5, 2015.

Synopsis
The series focuses on the day-to-day adventures of Robot Default, a genius inventor, living with his roommate Monster Krumholtz, a cheerful and enthusiastic purple creature, and their pest-turned-pet Marf.

The duo work at the Blinking Light Factory, owned by Robot's snobby older brother, Gart, who loves to make his little brother as miserable as possible; as well as run-ins with their neighbor Ogo, who is obsessed with the both of them.

Characters

Main

Monster Krumholtz (Harland Williams) is a purple minotaur-like monster. Monster is the eternal optimist living by the motto that "Good things happen to good people," and that all people are good. Monster is an extremely outgoing Organic that is endlessly fascinated by the little things in life. Monster is driven to make everyone happy, and the need to explore the "shiny thing." But because of Monster's fascination with the world, he is very gullible. Unlike Robot, Monster feels like everything goes his way, although it does not, making him a very good friend to have around.
Robot Default (Curtis Armstrong) is an orange robot who works as a quality control at the Blinking Light Factory. Robot always feels like the world is trying to keep him down, even his know-it-all brother Gart does not help at all. Luckily, after meeting Monster, who believes in him all the way, Robot is now best friends with Monster. He is the smarter, more cunning of the duo. He frequently tries to invent new devices, usually without success. He and Monster had been friends since they were kids, despite Monster being warned to stay away from him and his dangerous inventions.
Marf (Curtis Armstrong, Jeff Bennett in "Speak, Marf, Speak") is a pet of Robot and Monster. He is a block of metal who acts like a dog, and only says "marf".
Ogo (Jonathan Slavin) is the third wheel of Robot and Monster's friendship. He has an obsession with Robot and Monster, which tends to annoy Robot. He constantly tries to involve himself in the duo's doings, and just cannot seem to grasp that he is not part of the team. Ogo has been known to survive near death experiences. In "Ogo's Cool", Ogo zaps himself with Robot's cool ray to become popular, thus causing Robot and Monster to become obsessed with Ogo and he is creeped out. In "Ogo's Birthday" Monster still cherishes Ogo as one of his friends, though Robot does not. He is allergic to bacon which makes him drowsy/nauseous.
J.D. (Megan Hilty) is a cool, rebellious biker chick whose best friend is her equally hip robotic bike Spitfire. She is also good friends with Robot and Monster. Robot, Monster and nearly every guy at the Makin' Bacon have a huge crush on her. Robot and Monster at times try to impress J.D. but end up failing.
Spitfire (Cree Summer) is JD's equally hip robotic bike. They are inseparable best friends and regulars at the local bacon joint, Makin' Bacon. They are like the cooler, female versions of Robot and Monster. JD can be hot-headed at times while Spitfire is more rational and willing to avoid fights, but will fight for her friend. Spitfire can be bossy, as stated in "Biker Girls". Robot has shown slight interest in Spitfire before.
Gart Default (Maurice LaMarche) is Robot's arrogant, overbearing older brother. He is selfish and is always teasing Robot. He runs their family's Blinking Light factory. He is gold-tinted, is shinier than Robot, has six wheels for feet, while Robot has four, and has actual hands as opposed to Robot's claws.

Recurring
Perry (Maurice LaMarche) is a robot co-worker of Robot and Monster's. He always has a smile on his face, but it's due to a function problem, as revealed in "Come On, Get Happy". He is very unlucky, and when something is thrown, it almost always hits him. He usually feels miserable and the only thing that makes him genuinely happy is Robot's misfortunes. He is shaped like a sewage pipe, colored in orange with a yellow "2".
Nessie (Rhea Perlman) is the six-tentacled owner and manager of the Makin' Bacon.
Punch Morley (Fred Tatasciore) was once a Pole-O player and then he retired. He is now the handyman at the Blinking light factory. He has had short-term memory loss ever since he hit his head with a pole from a Pole-O game.
Crikey (Nolan North) is a sadistic robot who speaks with a Cockney accent. He also has an identical cousin named Blimey and usually torments Robot & Monster and gets beaten up by J.D. and Spitfire in a few episodes.
Mr. Wheelie (Kurtwood Smith) is Robot and Monster's irate and sarcastic landlord with a big blue spiky head and bicycle wheels for feet. He threatens to kick Robot and Monster out of their apartment if he finds their pet Marf, since pets are not allowed.
Master Grabmirist (Ping Wu) is a Sensei who meets up with Robot & Monster whenever they need help, however his methods tend to fail quickly.
Hal Worth-a-ton (Nolan North) is a Texan-accented salesman who lies about his products on the tube.
Pendulum Depot (Nolan North)  is a Mechanical who owns the Solid Light Factory and is the main rival to the Defaults and their Blinking Light Factory. He plans on stealing the Default's Blinking Light Formula, and make them out of business. He usually carries around a rocket umbrella for show.
Arpa Default (April Winchell) is Gart and Robot's mother whose arrogance Gart takes after. Despite her preference in Gart, it has been shown on few occasions that Arpa still loves her other son, Robot, by keeping a picture of him in her chest compartment.
Grandma Default (April Winchell) is Gart and Robot's grandmother and Arpa's mother, a cranky family member who speaks computer binary (says only "one" and "zero") and hates Organics.
Gizmo Default (Alan Tudyk) is Robot's crazy cousin who talks to imaginary people and is considered an embarrassment to the Default family.
Uncle Kuffley Krumholtz (Nolan North) is Monster's loud-mouth uncle who is a police officer and a teacher of the Traffic Walking School.
Globitha Krumholtz (Cree Summer) is Monster's hyperactive child sister who has a large (and annoying) affection towards Robot (Much to Monster's jealousy). Still, Monster shows her his affection/empathy. Robot does not want her to help him with inventions because she ruins everything she touches.
Lev Krumholtz (Bill Fagerbakke) is Monster's dad whose horns are bigger than him. His horns make him talented but are revealed to be false in "Hornica".
Lucy (Jennifer Cody) is a Mechanical who is Robot's long-time rival. To outsmart Robot in a contest to make a two-color blinking light, she befriended Ogo so she can use his brain as a processor chip to power the blinking light in "Ogo's Friend". She always denies Robot's existence, saying that she has no idea who he is.
The Prince of Scamtown (Fred Tatasciore) is a Mechanical who is of royal descent. He is generous despite his name. In "The Prince of Scamtown", Robot does not believe he is an actual prince although Monster does.
Loudmouth (Maurice LaMarche) is a tiny but very angry Mechanical who is one of Robot and Monster's co-workers at the Blinking Lights Factory.
Snap Winsome (Jeff Bennett) is an Organic and the host of various shows such as That's Amazing! and Ow! That Hurts!.
Dame Lady Madame (Ruth Williamson) is a prestigious female Mechanical of high-society.
Bea Holder (Harriet Sansom Harris) is a cycloptic Organic who is a trendsetter.
Howly (Maurice LaMarche) is a cyber monkey that flies into rage when having photos taken. Monster befriended it in "The Dark Night".
Lil' Lugnuts (Nolan North) is an Organic and was Monster's idol until Robot found that Lil' Lugnuts was actually a criminal.
Katie (Carol Ann Susi) is a mechanical lady, and the owner of Narf. She finds Robot and Monster to be annoying, and thinks Marf is a stupid name.
The Organic Pole-O Players are a series of players who seem to dislike Robot, Monster, and Punch Morley.

Episodes
 The chronological order of the series is by production code, rather than by how the episodes are aired or how they are listed on the DVD.

Reception
Emily Ashby of Common Sense Media gave the series 4 out of 5 stars; saying that, “Robot and Monster is a hilarious animated series that celebrates friendship and explores kid-related issues with comedy and quirkiness. [...] Each story includes a lesson about being a good friend, overcoming fear, or some other issue that kids will relate to.”

Home media
On November 11, 2014, the series was released on DVD as a manufacture on demand Amazon exclusive in region 1 (though two episodes remain unaired at the time it was released until the first episode aired on Nicktoons and the second episode was released through the Noggin app).

The complete series was made available for streaming as part of Nickelodeon's Noggin app on March 5, 2015.

The show was also added to Paramount+ on November 10, 2020.

References

External links

 
 

2012 American television series debuts
2015 American television series endings
2010s American animated television series
2010s American workplace comedy television series
2010s Nickelodeon original programming
American children's animated adventure television series
American children's animated comedy television series
Animated television series about monsters
Animated television series about robots
American computer-animated television series
English-language television shows
Nicktoons
Animated duos